Arthur Lovekin (12 November 1859 – 10 December 1931) was a journalist, newspaper editor and owner, and politician.

Early life
Lovekin was probably born in Slough, Buckinghamshire. He was partly educated at St Edmund's School, Canterbury, from 1871–75.

Victoria and South Australia
He came to Australia in 1879 and worked in Victoria for 12 months as a surveyor. The next year he joined The Age in Melbourne as a journalist; he married Elizabeth Jane Letcher on 26 June 1882. In 1883 he joined the South Australian Register, "and with Thomas Harry formed a partnership as public shorthand writers in 1885."

Western Australia
In 1886, Lovekin was a senior reporter on the Fremantle Herald: "the colony's first radical newspaper", according to the Australian Dictionary of Biography. The Herald was absorbed by the owners of a rival newspaper, Daily News, and in 1890, Lovekin became company secretary and director. In 1893, in England, he bought machinery which enabled Daily News to install the first rotary printing press and Linotype typesetting machines in Western Australia. By 1894, he was managing director and editor of Daily News. In 1896, Lovekin launched the Morning Herald in competition with John Winthrop Hackett's The West Australian. He provoked Australia's first newspaper strike in 1912, when he rejected a claim from Daily News journalists for equal pay with West Australian journalists. The strike lasted a week before Lovekin granted the claim. In 1916, he became sole owner of the Daily News. By the end of World War I, he was very wealthy thanks to stockpiles of newsprint he sold to newspapers affected by wartime shortages. Lovekin sold the Daily News to News Ltd for £86,000 in 1926.

Politics
In the 1890s Lovekin and Hackett, and Alexander and David Forrest, were regular attendees at Sunday morning discussions at the home of  Sir John Forrest.

During World War I Lovekin helped organise the conscription campaign in 1916, and "matched the 'King's Shilling' with his own", according to the Australian Dictionary of Biography.
From 1919 to 1931 Lovekin was a member of the Legislative Council for the Metropolitan Province.

Kings Park
In 1893 Lovekin was a foundation member of the Kings Park honorary committee, which became the King's Park Board in 1896 (and now known as Botanic Gardens and Parks Authority). In 1918 he became president for 13 years until his death. 

It was Lovekin's idea to honour WA's war dead by planting rows of commemorative trees in the park. His initiative was based on the Avenue of Honour in Ballarat, Victoria. In 1920 Lovekin and board member Sir William Loton each donated £500 to clear and plant Forrest Avenue with sugar gums. Forrest Avenue was renamed Lovekin Drive after his death.

Other interests
Lovekin was a chairman of the Children's Hospital board of management, helped set up the Perth Children's Court (and served on its bench for nearly 20 years), and was interested in economics, amateur theatre, cricket and cycling. He established the Arthur Lovekin Prize in Journalism in 1928.

References

1859 births
1931 deaths
People educated at St Edmund's School Canterbury
Journalists from Western Australia
Settlers of Western Australia